Robert Kelly (birth unknown) is an Irish professional rugby league footballer who played in the 1950s, and coached in the 1960s.

Playing career

International honours
Bob Kelly won caps for Other Nationalities while at Wakefield Trinity in 1955 against England, and France, and represented Great Britain while at Wakefield Trinity in 1956 against France (non-Test match).

Along with William "Billy" Banks, Edward "Ted" Cahill, Gordon Haynes, Keith Holliday, William "Billy" Ivison, John McKeown, George Parsons and Edward "Ted" Slevin, Bob Kelly's only Great Britain appearance came against France prior to 1957, these matches were not considered as Test matches by the Rugby Football League, and consequently caps were not awarded.

County Cup Final appearances
Bob Kelly played right-, i.e. number 12, in Keighley's 3-17 defeat by Wakefield Trinity in the 1951–52 Yorkshire County Cup Final during the 1951–52 season at Fartown Ground, Huddersfield on Saturday 27 October 1951 in front of a crowd of 25,495, played left-, i.e. number 11, and was captain in Wakefield Trinity's 23-5 victory over Hunslet in the 1956–57 Yorkshire County Cup Final during the 1956–57 season at Headingley Rugby Stadium, Leeds on Saturday 20 October 1956 in front of a crowd of 31,147, and played left- in the 20-24 defeat by Leeds in the 1958–59 Yorkshire County Cup Final during the 1958–59 season at Odsal Stadium, Bradford on Saturday 18 October 1958.

Notable tour matches
Bob Kelly played left-, i.e. number 11, in Wakefield Trinity’s 17–12 victory over Australia in the 1956–57 Kangaroo tour of Great Britain and France match at Belle Vue, Wakefield on Monday 10 December 1956.

Contemporaneous Article Extract

"…Kelly joined Trinity from Keighley R.L. in an exchange deal with Harry Murphy in season 1952-3…".

Coaching career

Club career
Bob Kelly was the coach of Batley from July 1962 to October 1962.

Honoured by Rugby League Ireland
On 25 March 2004 six footballers were inducted into Rugby League Ireland's inaugural Hall of Fame at the Rugby League Heritage Centre in Huddersfield, they were; John "Jack" Daly (Huddersfield/Featherstone Rovers), Robert "Bob" Kelly (Keighley/Wakefield Trinity/Batley), Seamus McCallion (Halifax/Leeds/Bramley), Thomas "Tom" McKinney, (Salford/Warrington/St. Helens), Terry O'Connor (Salford/Wigan Warriors/Widnes Vikings), Patrick "Paddy" Reid (Huddersfield/Halifax).

References

External links
!Great Britain Statistics at englandrl.co.uk (statistics currently missing due to not having appeared for both Great Britain, and England)

Living people
Batley Bulldogs captains
Batley Bulldogs coaches
Batley Bulldogs players
Great Britain national rugby league team players
Irish rugby league coaches
Irish rugby league players
Keighley Cougars players
Other Nationalities rugby league team players
Place of birth missing (living people)
Rugby league props
Rugby league second-rows
Wakefield Trinity captains
Wakefield Trinity players
Year of birth missing (living people)